Gavin Lewis (born October 27, 2003) is an American actor. He is best known for the role of Moody Richardson in the American drama streaming television miniseries Little Fires Everywhere and Prince Maxemil “Emil” Vanderklaut III in the Netflix sitcom Prince of Peoria.

Early life
Lewis was born in Salt Lake City, Utah to theatre professionals Kyle and Colleen Lewis. He was diagnosed with Type 1 diabetes at age 6. Shortly after his diagnosis he met singer and actor Nick Jonas who also has Type 1 diabetes. This meeting inspired Lewis to pursue acting and music. At the age of 9 he booked his first role in a feature film which was filming in Park City, Utah. This production led to a meeting with an acting manager in Los Angeles and his full-time career in film and television.

Career
Lewis began his career working on Utah stages. He was classically trained at a very young age, earning top honors at the Utah Shakespeare Festival's Shakespeare Competition. Lewis has played various roles in several films and television series, such as Maximum Ride, NCIS: Los Angeles, The Kicks, No Good Nick, and Roswell, New Mexico.

In 2018 Lewis was cast as Prince Emil in the Netflix live-action multi-cam comedy Prince of Peoria. In 2019 he was cast as Reese Witherspoon’s son Moody Richardson on Hulu’s adaptation of the Celeste Ng best seller Little Fires Everywhere. He also joined the main cast of HBO Max's reboot of Head of the Class, which premiered in October 2021. Lewis guest starred in Shrinking on Apple TV+ which premiered in 2023.

Filmography

Film

Television

References

External links
 

2003 births
21st-century American male actors
American male child actors
American male film actors
American male television actors
American male voice actors
Male actors from Utah
Living people
People with type 1 diabetes